The Pole of Inaccessibility research station is a defunct Soviet research station in Kemp Land, Antarctica, at the southern pole of inaccessibility (the point in Antarctica furthest from any ocean) as defined in 1958 when the station was established. Later definitions give other locations, all relatively near this point. It performed meteorological observations from 14 to 26 December 1958.

It was reached on 14 December 1958 by an 18-man traversing party of the 3rd Soviet Antarctic Expedition. Its WMO ID is 89550.

History
Equipment and personnel were delivered by an Antarctic tractor convoy operated by the 3rd Soviet Antarctic Expedition. The station had a hut for four people, a radio shack, and an electrical hut. These buildings had been constructed on the tractors used during the traverse, serving as accommodation. Next to the hut, an airstrip was cleared and a Li-2 aircraft landed there on 18 December 1958. The outpost was equipped with a diesel power generator and a transmitter. On 26 December the outpost was vacated indefinitely. Four researchers were airlifted out, and the remaining 14 members of the party returned with the tractors. The station was deemed to be too far from other research stations to allow safe permanent operation, so it was left to be used for future short-term visits only.

The 8th Soviet Antarctic Expedition visited the site on 1 February 1964 and left five days later.

The American Queen Maud Land Traverse reached the Pole of Inaccessibility from Amundsen–Scott South Pole Station on 27 January 1965. The crew were flown out by a Lockheed C-130 Hercules on 1 February. On 15 December 1965 a new American crew arrived by C-130 to make observations, refurbish the snow cats, and continue the Queen Maud Land Traverse, zig-zagging to the newly installed Plateau Station, where they arrived on 29 January 1966.

The 12th Soviet Antarctic Expedition visited the site in 1967.

On 19 January 2007, the British Team N2i reached the Pole of Inaccessibility using specially-designed foil kites.

Historic site
The station building is surmounted by a bust of Vladimir Lenin facing Moscow. As of 2007, it is almost entirely buried by snow, with little more than the bust visible. Following a proposal by Russia to the Antarctic Treaty Consultative Meeting, the buried building and emergent bust, along with a plaque commemorating the conquest of the Pole of Inaccessibility by Soviet Antarctic explorers in 1958, has been designated a Historic Site or Monument (HSM 4).

See also
 Soviet Antarctic Expedition
 List of Antarctic research stations
 List of Antarctic field camps
 Henry Cookson, British Adventurer
 Historic Sites and Monuments in Antarctica

References

Further reading

 Antarctica 2011-2012 Legacy Transcontinental Crossing
 Crossing the Antarctic: Sebastian Copeland and Rossignol Partner to fulfill a legacy

Outposts of Antarctica
Outposts of Kemp Land
Russia and the Antarctic
Soviet Union and the Antarctic
Monuments and memorials to Vladimir Lenin
Historic buildings and structures in Antarctica
Former populated places in Antarctica
1958 establishments in Antarctica
1958 disestablishments in Antarctica
1958 establishments in the Soviet Union